The Unmarried Woman is a 1917 German silent drama film, directed by Rudolf Del Zopp and starring Hanne Brinkmann and Reinhold Schünzel.

Cast
 Hanne Brinkmann
 Reinhold Schünzel
 Kitty Johns
 Harry Waghalter

References

Bibliography
 Bock, Hans-Michael & Bergfelder, Tim. The Concise CineGraph. Encyclopedia of German Cinema. Berghahn Books, 2009.

External links

1917 films
Films of the German Empire
German silent feature films
Films directed by Rudolf Del Zopp
German black-and-white films
1917 drama films
German drama films
Silent drama films
1910s German films
Films shot at Terra Studios